Frost/Nixon is a 2008 historical drama film based on the 2006 play of the same name by Peter Morgan, who also adapted the screenplay. The film tells the story behind the Frost/Nixon interviews of 1977. The film was directed by Ron Howard. A co-production of the United States, the United Kingdom and France, the film was produced for Universal Pictures by Howard, Brian Grazer of Imagine Entertainment, and Tim Bevan and Eric Fellner of Working Title Films, and received five Oscar nominations, including Best Picture, Best Actor, and Best Director.

The film reunites the original two stars from the West End and Broadway productions of the play: Michael Sheen as British television broadcaster David Frost and Frank Langella as former United States President Richard Nixon. It was released in the United States on December 5, 2008, and in the United Kingdom on January 23, 2009. Despite critical acclaim, the film underperformed at the box office.

Plot
After the Watergate scandal of 1972 and his subsequent resignation in 1974, 400 million people worldwide watch on television as United States President Richard Nixon departs the White House aboard Marine One. Among those watching is British journalist David Frost, who is recording a talk show in Australia at the time, and who decides that day to interview Nixon.

Nixon's literary agent, Irving Lazar, believes the interviews would be an opportunity for Nixon to salvage his reputation and profit financially. Lazar demands $500,000 and ultimately secures $600,000 after Frost accepts.

After persuading his friend and producer John Birt that the interviews could be a success, Frost travels with Birt to California to meet with Nixon. On board the plane, Frost flirts with a young woman named Caroline Cushing, and the pair begin a relationship as she tags along for the trip.

Frost struggles to sell the interviews to American networks, and decides to finance the project with private money. He brokers his own deals with advertisers and local TV stations to syndicate the broadcast of the interviews. He and Birt hire two investigators — Bob Zelnick and James Reston Jr. — to help Frost prepare. Frost is unsure as to what he wants from the interviews; Reston encourages him to aim for a confession from Nixon.

Under scrutiny by Nixon's post-presidential chief of staff, Jack Brennan, Frost and Nixon embark on the first three recording sessions. Frost is restricted by an agreed-upon timeframe and, under pressure from his own team, attempts to ask tough questions. However, Nixon dominates the sessions regarding the Vietnam War and his achievements in foreign policy. Behind the scenes, Frost's editorial team is nervous about Frost's capacity as a journalist and angry that Nixon appears to be exonerating himself.

Four days before the final interview, which will focus on Watergate, Frost receives a phone call from an inebriated Nixon. In a drunken rant, Nixon declares that they both know the final interview will make or break their careers. He compares himself to Frost, insisting that they both came from humble backgrounds and had to struggle to make it to the top of their fields, only to be knocked back down again. Frost gains new insight into his subject, while Nixon assures Frost that he will do everything in his power to emerge the victor of the final interview.

The conversation spurs Frost into action. For the next three days, he works relentlessly to prepare as Reston pursues a lead at the Federal Courthouse library in Washington.

As the final interview begins, Frost ambushes Nixon with damning transcripts of a conversation between Nixon and Charles Colson that Reston dug up in Washington. As his own team watches in horror from an adjoining room, Nixon admits that he did unethical things, adding, "When the President does it, that means it's not illegal." A stunned Frost is on the verge of inducing a confession when Brennan bursts in and stops the recording. After Nixon and Brennan confer, the interview resumes. Frost aggressively pursues his original line of questioning; Nixon admits that he participated in a cover-up and that he "let the American people down."

Some time after the interviews have aired, Frost and Cushing pay a farewell visit to Nixon at his villa. Frost thanks Nixon for the interviews and Nixon, graciously admitting defeat, thanks Frost in return and wishes him well. Frost gifts Nixon a pair of Italian shoes identical to the ones Frost wore during the interviews that Nixon had admired. In a private moment, Nixon asks about the night he drunkenly called Frost, implying that he has no recollection of the event. For the first time, Nixon addresses Frost by his first name. Nixon watches Frost and Cushing leave before placing the shoes on the villa's stone railing and solemnly looking out at the sunset.

A textual epilogue states that the interviews were wildly successful and that Nixon never escaped controversy until his death from a stroke in 1994.

Cast

Other figures and personalities depicted in the film include Tricia Nixon Cox, Michael York, Hugh Hefner, helicopter pilot Gene Boyer (as himself), Raymond Price, Ken Khachigian, Sue Mengers and Jay White as Neil Diamond. To prepare for his role as Richard Nixon, Frank Langella visited the Richard Nixon Presidential Library in Yorba Linda, California, and interviewed many people who had known the former president. On the set, the cast and crew addressed Langella as "Mr. President".

Release
Frost/Nixon had its world premiere on October 15, 2008, as the opening film of the 52nd annual London Film Festival. It was released in three theaters in the United States on December 5 before expanding several times over the following weeks. It was released in the United Kingdom and expanded into wide status in the United States on January 23, 2009.

The film was released on DVD and Blu-ray on April 21, 2009. Special features include deleted scenes, the making of the film, the real interviews between Frost and Nixon, the Nixon Presidential Library and a feature commentary with Ron Howard.

Box office
Frost/Nixon had a limited release at three theaters on December 5, 2008, and grossed $180,708 in its opening weekend, ranking number 22. Opening wide at 1,099 theaters on January 23, 2009, the film grossed $3,022,250 at the box office in the United States and Canada, ranking number 16. The film's gross for Friday, January 30 was estimated the next day at $420,000. Frost/Nixon grossed an estimated $18,622,031 in the United States and Canada and $8,804,304 in other territories for a total of $27,426,335 worldwide, recouping its $25 million budget by a thin margin but making a loss when factoring in the significant promotional costs.

Critical response
On review aggregation website Rotten Tomatoes, the film has an approval rating of 93% based on 258 reviews, with a weighted average score of 8.00/10. The site's critical consensus reads, "Frost/Nixon is weighty and eloquent; a cross between a boxing match and a ballet with Oscar worthy performances." Metacritic gives the film an average score of 80 out of 100, based on 38 critics, indicating "generally favorable reviews".

Critic Roger Ebert gave the film four stars, commenting that Langella and Sheen "do not attempt to mimic their characters, but to embody them." Peter Travers of Rolling Stone gave the film 3½ stars, saying that Ron Howard "turned Peter Morgan's stage success into a grabber of a movie laced with tension, stinging wit and potent human drama." Writing for Variety, Todd McCarthy praised Langella's performance in particular, stating, "[B]y the final scenes, Langella has all but disappeared so as to deliver Nixon himself." René Rodríguez of The Miami Herald gave the film two stars and commented that the picture "pales in comparison to Oliver Stone's Nixon when it comes to humanizing the infamous leader" despite writing that the film "faithfully reenacts the events leading up to the historic 1977 interviews." Manohla Dargis of The New York Times said, "[S]tories of lost crowns lend themselves to drama, but not necessarily audience-pleasing entertainments, which may explain why Frost/Nixon registers as such a soothing, agreeably amusing experience, more palliative than purgative."

Dramatic license and factual inaccuracies
Both the film and the play take dramatic license with the on-air and behind-the-scene details of the Nixon interviews. Jonathan Aitken, one of Nixon's official biographers who spent much time with the former president at La Casa Pacifica, rebukes the film for its portrayal of a drunken Nixon making a late-night phone call as never having happened. Ron Howard discussed the scene on his feature commentary for the DVD release, pointing out it was a deliberate act of dramatic license, and while Frost never received such a phone call, "it was known that Richard Nixon, during ...the Watergate scandal, had occasionally made midnight phone calls that he couldn't very well recall the following day." Elizabeth Drew of the Huffington Post and author of Richard M. Nixon (2007) noted some inaccuracies, including a misrepresentation of the end of the interviews, the failure to mention the fact that Nixon received 20% of the profits from the interviews, and what she says are inaccurate representations of some of the characters. Drew points out a critical line in the movie that is particularly deceptive: Nixon admitted he "'...was involved in a 'cover-up,' as you call it.' The ellipsis is of course unknown to the audience, and is crucial: What Nixon actually said was, 'You're wanting me to say that I participated in an illegal cover-up. No!'"

According to a 2014 Baltimore Sun article by Jules Witcover, Nixon didn't admit his guilt until he was interviewed in 1983 by former White House aide Frank Gannon (played by Andy Milder in the film).

David Edelstein of New York wrote that the film overstates the importance of its basis, the Frost interviews, stating it "elevates the 1977 interviews Nixon gave (or, rather, sold, for an unheard-of $600,000) to British TV personality David Frost into a momentous event in the history of politics and media." Edelstein also noted that "with selective editing, Morgan makes it seem as if Frost got Nixon to admit more than he actually did." Edelstein wrote that the film "is brisk, well crafted, and enjoyable enough, but the characters seem thinner (Sheen is all frozen smiles and squirms) and the outcome less consequential."

Writing for the conservative National Review, Fred Schwarz, who deemed the Frost/Nixon interviews "a notorious fizzle", commented that, the film "is an attempt to use history, assisted by plenty of dramatic license, to retrospectively turn a loss into a win. By all accounts, Frost/Nixon does a fine job of dramatizing the negotiations and preparation that led up to the interviews. And it’s hard to imagine Frank Langella, who plays a Brezhnev-looking Nixon, giving a bad performance. Still, the movie’s fundamental premise is just plain wrong." Though generally approving, critic Daniel Eagan notes that partisans on both sides have questioned the accuracy of the film's script.

Caroline Cushing Graham, in a December 2008 interview, noted that her first trip with Frost was to the Muhammad Ali fight in Zaire, and that the two had been together for more than five years prior to when the film shows the two meeting. She remembered Frost as feeling that he did a pretty good job on every interview, whereas the film depicts him feeling he did a poor job with the first two interviews. She added that while the movie shows Frost driving, in fact they were always chauffeured because he was always making notes for the work he was doing.

The film implies that Nixon and Frost were meeting for the first time in 1977 for these interviews, but in fact Frost had interviewed Nixon for U.S. network television in 1968 as part of a series of interviews of leading candidates in the Presidential election of that year.

Diane Sawyer, portrayed in the film in her role as one of Nixon's researchers, said in December 2008 that, "Jack Brennan is portrayed as a stern military guy," citing both the play and what she'd heard about the film version. "And he’s the funniest guy you ever met in your life, an irreverent, wonderful guy. So there you go. It's the movies."

An early scene in the film set on the southern shore of Sydney Harbour in 1974, with the Sydney Opera House as a backdrop, shows buildings adjacent to the iconic structure which did not exist until 1998.

Awards and nominations

References

External links

 
 
 
 

2008 drama films
2008 films
American political drama films
British drama films
American docudrama films
Drama films based on actual events
2000s English-language films
Films scored by Hans Zimmer
British films based on plays
American films based on plays
Films directed by Ron Howard
Films produced by Brian Grazer
Films produced by Eric Fellner
Films produced by Tim Bevan
Films set in 1977
Films set in California
Films set in Los Angeles
Films set in Sydney
Films set in Washington, D.C.
Films set in the 1970s
French political drama films
Imagine Entertainment films
Political films based on actual events
Relativity Media films
Films about Richard Nixon
Films with screenplays by Peter Morgan
StudioCanal films
Universal Pictures films
Watergate scandal in film
Working Title Films films
Films about presidents of the United States
2000s American films
2000s British films
2000s French films